Roy Kinikinilau (born 14 February 1980) is a rugby union player who plays for the Ricoh Black Rams in the Top League in Japan. A powerful winger, Kinkinilau is also an accomplished rugby sevens player. Born in Tonga, he represented New Zealand internationally in rugby sevens competitions.

Playing career

Provincial Rugby

Kinkinilau was born in Tonga but came to New Zealand at age 6. He made his provincial debut for Wellington in 2002 at number eight but due to his pace and athleticism was converted to a wing the following season.

Kinkinilau spent four seasons at Wellington before transferring to Waikato for the 2006 Air New Zealand Cup. Although he helped Waikato to a championship-winning campaign, he didn't play in the finals against his old team, Wellington.

Following the 2007 Air New Zealand Cup, he signed in Japan.

Super Rugby

Despite an admirable try-scoring record, Kinikinilau never really found a settled place in the Super Rugby competition.

He made his debut for the Hurricanes in the 2004 Super 12 season, and impressively scored 5 tries in only 9 appearances. However, he was not included in the side for the 2005 season.

For 2006, Kinikinilau was drafted to the Highlanders. He started the season with a bang, with 4 tries from his first 4 starts, but came off the boil as the season went along, ending the year on the substitute's bench. He did, however, lead the side with 5 tries.

Kinikinilau was on the move again for the 2007 Super 14 season, this time drafted to the Chiefs. He started 12 of the team's 13 games and scored another four tries.

Japan

Kinikinilau left New Zealand in 2007 to sign in Japan with the Ricoh Black Rams. He has remained with the team through 2010-11, where he scored 5 tries in 9 appearances.

Rugby Sevens

Kinikinilau was a dynamic rugby sevens player who exploded onto the international scene in style, scoring 37 tries in 7 competitions in 2002 and 2003. He continued as an elite sevens player through 2007, when he helped New Zealand win the 2006-07 IRB Sevens World Series.

References

External links
Hurricanes Profile

Tongan rugby union players
1980 births
Living people
New Zealand rugby union players
Rugby union wings
Tongan emigrants to New Zealand
Chiefs (rugby union) players
Hurricanes (rugby union) players
Highlanders (rugby union) players
Wellington rugby union players
Waikato rugby union players
New Zealand expatriate rugby union players
Expatriate rugby union players in Japan
New Zealand expatriate sportspeople in Japan
Black Rams Tokyo players